CBE SA (a.k.a. Ethiopia Nigd Bank) was an Ethiopian football club, in the city of Addis Abeba. They played in the Ethiopian Premier League, the top level of professional football in Ethiopia.

History 
The club was founded in 1982 (1975 E.C.) by the Commercial Bank of Ethiopia.

In 2010, the club was renamed from Banks Sport Club to Commercial Bank of Ethiopia Sports Association.

In the 2020/21 season, the club played in the Ethiopian League 1 and advanced to the Ethiopian Higher League.

In the 2021/22 season, the club made their debut after a long absence from the Ethiopian Higher League but failed to qualify for the Premier League as runners-up to Ethio Electric.

Achievements 

 Addis Ababa City Cup: 1

2014

Performance in CAF competitions
CAF Confederation Cup: 2 appearances
2005 – First Round
2010 – First Round

References

Football clubs in Ethiopia
Football clubs in Addis Ababa
Defunct football clubs in Ethiopia
Association football clubs disestablished in 2017
Association football clubs established in 1982
1982 establishments in Ethiopia
2017 disestablishments in Ethiopia
Financial services association football clubs in Ethiopia